Elvis Christmas is a CD collection featuring  all of the tracks from Elvis Presley's RCA Victor LPs, Elvis' Christmas Album (issued in 1957) and  Elvis Sings the Wonderful World of Christmas (issued in 1971). The RIAA awarded it a Gold Record on 15 September 2011.

Track listing

"Santa Claus Is Back in Town"
"White Christmas"
"Here Comes Santa Claus (Right Down Santa Claus Lane)"
"I'll Be Home for Christmas"
"Blue Christmas"
"Santa Bring My Baby Back (To Me)"
"O Little Town of Bethlehem"
"Silent Night"
"(There'll Be) Peace in the Valley (For Me)"
"I Believe"
"Take My Hand, Precious Lord"
"It's No Secret (What God Can Do)"
"O Come, All Ye Faithful"
"The First Noel"
"On A Snowy Christmas Night"
"Winter Wonderland"
"The Wonderful World of Christmas"
"It Won't Seem Like Christmas (Without You)"
"I'll Be Home on Christmas Day"
"If I Get Home on Christmas Day"
"Holly Leaves and Christmas Trees"
"Merry Christmas Baby"
"Silver Bells"

Chart performance

References

2006 compilation albums
2006 Christmas albums
Christmas albums by American artists
Christmas compilation albums
Elvis Presley compilation albums
Compilation albums published posthumously